Vicia pyrenaica, known as Pyrenean vetch, is a species of flowering plant in the bean family Fabaceae. It is grown as an ornamental and is a hardy perennial with compact foliage that produces deep crimson flowers in Summer.

References

pyrenaica